Tuen Mun Ferry Pier is an MTR Light Rail terminus located at ground level inside Pierhead Garden, Tuen Mun Ferry Pier, Wu Chui Road in Tuen Mun, Tuen Mun District. It began service on 18 September 1988, and belongs to Zone 1. It serves Tuen Mun Ferry Pier and nearby residential buildings.

The terminus has seven platforms. Platform 2 is used for route 507, platform 3 for routes 615 and 615P, platform 4 for route 610, and platform 5 for routes 614 and 614P. Platforms 1 and 6 are reserved for emergency purposes, while Platform 7 is for alighting only. It also has a customer service centre and a bus terminus.

This stop has the largest number of terminating lines in the Light Rail system (six).

History
The stop was opened to the public on 18 September 1988, as Ferry Pier. On the previous day, the Light Rail Transit system was declared open by Anne, Princess Royal, at this stop; the commemorative plaque she unveiled still remains intact. The stop was renamed Ferry Pier Terminus later.

On 13 June 2010, the terminus was renamed Tuen Mun Ferry Pier.

Hazard to pedestrians
Because of the planning of this Light Rail stop, the pathways for pedestrians are very close to the rails; it is dangerous for a pedestrian to cross from one platform to another when a train is approaching. However, some pedestrian crossing signal lights that light up when trains approach were added.

References

MTR Light Rail stops
Former Kowloon–Canton Railway stations
Tuen Mun District
Railway stations in Hong Kong opened in 1988